Riang may refer to:

 Riang language of Palaung (Austroasiatic speakers in Myanmar)
 Reang tribe (Sino-Tibetan speakers in India Tripura)